Dia, also pronounced locally Ntia, is an uninhabited island off the northern coast of the Greek island of Crete. The island is 5 km long, 3 km wide and is located approximately 13 km north of Heraklion. Administratively, Dia is part of the community of Elia within the municipal unit of Gouves, Hersonissos municipality in Heraklion.

In the south coast of Dia there are four coves, from west to east Agios Georgios, Kapari, Panagia (Madonna) and Agrielia. One more cove, Aginara, is to the east.

History
The island was formerly known as Standia, by juncture loss in the phrase  (Greek for 'on Dia').

It was the principal port of Crete for centuries. Its four south coves have been used as anchorages since the Minoan period.

Mythology
The islet looks like a giant lizard when viewed from the city of Heraklion. Greek mythology tells of a giant lizard that tried to destroy the island of Crete, however, Zeus turned it into stone with a thunderbolt, thus creating the island.

The island is visible from Crete's capital city of Heraklion, as it would have been in the time of the Minoans, from Knossos.  Because of this, it was sometimes identified as the island that Theseus escaped to after killing the minotaur.

Environment
The island has been recognised as an Important Bird Area (IBA) by BirdLife International because it supports a breeding population of 300–380 pairs of the Eleonora's falcons.
Dia is part of the European Network of Nature (Natura 2000) and is a protected hunting ground.  There are also a number of protected plants such as Carlina diae.

Ancient port

In 1976, Jacques Cousteau carried out underwater exploration around Dia and found the remains of an ancient port in the waters between Heraklion and Dia.

See also
List of islands of Greece

References

External links
Standia map by Marco Boschini

Islands of Crete
Landforms of Heraklion (regional unit)
Mediterranean islands
Populated places in Heraklion (regional unit)
Islands of Greece
Locations in Greek mythology
Important Bird Areas of Crete